The Sins of the Mother is a 1921 German silent drama film directed by Georg Jacoby and starring Carl Auen and Käthe Dorsch.

The film's sets were designed by the art director Kurt Richter.

Cast
Curt Ehrle as Fabrikbesitzer Windolf Harrison
Toni Zimmerer as Prokurist Charles Barker
Grete Sellin as Dessen Frau Anni
Käthe Dorsch as Louisa, beider Tochter
Carl Auen as Ronald, beider Sohn
Hanna Ralph as Harriet Kellogg, Schauspielerin
Erika Glässner as Margit, ihre Tochter
Paul Otto as John Vaugham
Harry Liedtke as William Jeffries
Hermann Thimig as Fred Hastings, sein Freund

References

External links

Films of the Weimar Republic
German silent feature films
Films directed by Georg Jacoby
UFA GmbH films
German drama films
1921 drama films
German black-and-white films
Silent drama films
1920s German films
1920s German-language films